Nyswander may refer to:
Dorothy Nyswander, health educator, centenarian, and mother of Marie
Marie Nyswander, psychiatrist, expert on addiction, and daughter of Dorothy
Detective Nyswander, a character in Burglar (film)